Eudectus is a genus of beetles belonging to the family Staphylinidae.

The species of this genus are found in Europe and Japan.

Species:
 Eudectus altaiensis Zerche, 1990 
 Eudectus crassicornis LeConte, 1884

References

Staphylinidae
Staphylinidae genera